Sleep Like a Tiger, written by Mary Logue and illustrated by Pamela Zagarenski, is a 2012 picture book published by HMH Books for Young Readers. Sleep Like a Tiger was a Caldecott Medal Honor Book in 2013. Other works of Zagarenski are Red Sings from Treetops: A Year in Colors, which was also a Caldecott Medal Honor Book in 2010, and This Is Just to Say: Poems of Apology and Forgiveness, which is a 2008 Lee Bennett Hopkins Poetry Award Honor Book.

Description
The story, written by Logue, told in present tense, is a fiction book of 40 pages that follows a very awake little girl asking her parents if everything goes to sleep. The illustrations by Zagarenski show a family surrounded by images of crowns and ornate patterns while the parents coax the little girl to bed. It is a whimsical story with universal appeal. Most of the text is found at the beginning of the book, allowing kids to become drowsy as the story continues making this book a perfect bed time story. Sleep Like a Tiger also uses different analogies to relate animals and their sleep behaviors to those of the little girl.
. The parents in this book practice the psychological art of paradoxical intention, realizing that instead of forcing the little girl to go to sleep they let her naturally relax in bed knowing that sleep will come.

Plot
Starting with the old adage "Once there was a little girl..." you come across a little girl and her parents, all wearing crowns. The little girl is wide awake claiming she is not tired. Her parents take this almost as a regular occurrence and require that she at least put on her pajamas, wash her face, brush her teeth. The little girl keeps repeating that she is not tired but climbs into bed and under the sheets since that is where she is the most comfortable. She then proceeds to ask her parents if everything thing goes to sleep. The parents then proceed to go through a list of animals and their habits of sleeping. They discuss the family dog, the cat, bats, snails, bears, and whales. The little girl proclaims that she knows an animal that sleeps a lot. We then finally come across the tiger in the jungle, where the little girl tells her parents that he sleeps to stay strong. The parents agree that sleep is good to stay strong then say goodnight even though the little girl claims she is still not sleepy. Her parents know what will happen and agree that she can stay awake all night long. After the long discussion, the little girl goes through all the processes that the animals go through and ends up fast asleep.

Critical reception
Sleep Like a Tiger was published to very strong reviews. Kirkus Reviews claim that Zagarenski's illustrations are the perfect backdrop to the stories lyrical quality, with her use of different textures, busy lines, and tiny details, observant readers will be pleasantly rewarded. Zagarenski usually has objects hidden in her illustrations having readers take closer looks and finding new objects even after the tenth time reading it, provides entertainment for both children and parents. Her work is a perfect combination of digitally created art and mixed media on wood. The Washington Post claims that Zagarenski's soft-toned dreamscapes of moons and stars and toys perfectly match the lyrical text and magnifies the mood.

See also

Children's Literature
Picture Books

References

2012 children's books
American children's books
American picture books
Caldecott Honor-winning works
Sleep in fiction
Books about tigers